Costigliolo is an Italian surname. Notable people with the surname include:

Carlo Costigliolo (1893–1968), Italian gymnast, brother of Luigi
Luigi Costigliolo (1892–1939), Italian gymnast

See also
Costigliole (disambiguation)

Italian-language surnames